Khanom khai nok kratha is a Thai snack.

The sweet is a fried sweet potato dough ball. Khanom is placed at the beginning of the name of a sweet to indicate the food item is a dessert or snack; khai nok kratha means quail's egg, as the size of the dough ball is roughly the same size as that of a quail's egg.

References

Thai desserts and snacks
Thai doughnuts